Thomas Goodwill (7 September 1894 – 1 July 1916) was an English professional footballer who played as an outside left in the Football League for Newcastle United. He was described as "a quick mover, he possessed a good cross and shot and delighted the crowd on many an appearance".

Personal life 
Prior to becoming a professional footballer, Goodwill worked as a sheave lad at Earsdon Colliery. He served as a private in the Northumberland Fusiliers during the First World War. Goodwill was killed on the first day of the Battle of the Somme, during the third wave of his battalion's attack south of Thiepval. He is commemorated on the Thiepval Memorial.

Career statistics

References

1894 births
1916 deaths
English footballers
Association football outside forwards
Seaton Delaval F.C. players
Newcastle United F.C. players
English Football League players
British Army personnel of World War I
Royal Northumberland Fusiliers soldiers
British military personnel killed in the Battle of the Somme
English miners
Military personnel from Northumberland
British coal miners
Footballers from Northumberland